Maksymilianów may refer to the following places:
Maksymilianów, Poddębice County in Łódź Voivodeship (central Poland)
Maksymilianów, Tomaszów Mazowiecki County in Łódź Voivodeship (central Poland)
Maksymilianów, Świętokrzyskie Voivodeship (south-central Poland)
Maksymilianów, Radom County in Masovian Voivodeship (east-central Poland)
Maksymilianów, Węgrów County in Masovian Voivodeship (east-central Poland)
Maksymilianów, Greater Poland Voivodeship (west-central Poland)